A fast casual restaurant, found primarily in the United States and Canada, does not offer full table service, but advertises higher quality food than fast food restaurants, with fewer frozen or processed ingredients. It is an intermediate concept between fast food and casual dining.

History 
The concept originated in the United States in the early 1990s, but did not become mainstream until the end of the 2000s and the beginning of the 2010s.  During the economic recession that began in 2007, the category of fast casual dining saw increased sales to the 18–34-year-old demographic. Customers with limited discretionary spending for meals tend to choose fast casual for dining perceived as healthier.

Definition 
The founder and publisher of FastCasual.com, Paul Barron, is credited with coining the term "fast-casual" in the late 1990s.  Horatio Lonsdale-Hands, former Chairman and CEO of ZuZu Inc., is also credited with coining the term "fast-casual".  ZuZu, a handmade Mexican food concept co-founded by Lonsdale-Hands and Espartaco Borga in 1989, filed a U.S. Federal trademark registration for the term "fast-casual" in November 1995, leading Michael DeLuca to call Lonsdale-Hands a "progressive pioneer in the burgeoning 'fast-casual' market segment" in the July 1996 edition of Restaurant Hospitality.

The company Technomic Information Services defined "fast-casual restaurants" as meeting the following criteria:
 Limited-service or self-service format
 Average meal price between $8 and $15
 Made-to-order food with more complex flavors than fast food restaurants
 Upscale, unique or highly developed décor
 Most often will not have a drive-through

See also 
 List of casual dining restaurant chains
 List of fast food restaurant chains
 Delicatessen
 Diner

References 

 
restaurants by type